The 2017 Kilkenny Senior Hurling Championship was the 123rd staging of the Kilkenny Senior Hurling Championship since its establishment by the Kilkenny County Board in 1887. The championship began on 16 September 2017 and ended 29 October 2017.

O'Loughlin Gaels were the defending champions, however, they were defeated by Dicksboro in the semi-final.

On 29 October 2017, Dicksboro won the championship following a 4-15 to 4-10 defeat of James Stephens in the final. This was their fifth championship title overall and their first since 1993.

David Walton of the James Stephens club was the championship's top scorer with 1-51.

Team changes

To Championship

Promoted from the Kilkenny Intermediate Hurling Championship
 Carrickshock

From Championship

Relegated to the Kilkenny Intermediate Hurling Championship
 Fenians

Results

First round

Four of the twelve teams received byes into the quarter finals. The remaining eight teams played in four matches with the winners progressing to the quarter finals.

Relegation play-off

Quarter-finals

Semi-finals

Final

Championship statistics

Top scorers

Top scorers overall

Top scorers in a single game

References

External links

 2017 Kilkenny Senior Hurling Championship results

Kilkenny Senior Hurling Championship
Kilkenny Senior Hurling Championship